The men's competition in the featherweight (under 62 kg) division was held on 18 and 19 September 2010.

Schedule

Medalists

Records

Results

References
Pages 33–34 

- Mens 62 kg, 2010 World Weightlifting Championships